The Czech Air Force is the air force branch of the Army of the Czech Republic. Along with the Land Forces, the Air Force is the major Czech military force. With traditions of military aviation dating back to 1918, the Czech Air Force, together with the Slovak Air Force, succeeded the Czechoslovak Air Force in 1993. On 1 July 1997, the 3rd Tactical Aviation Corps and the 4th Air Defence Corps of the Czech Army were merged to form an independent Air Force Headquarters.

The Air Force is responsible for securing the integrity of the Czech Republic's airspace through the NATO Integrated Air Defence System (NIADS), close air support to the Land Forces and for transportation tasks including government and state priority flights. In peacetime the Air Force is contributing to tasks originating in the Czech laws and interministerial agreements, for example to the air ambulance service or the SAR role.

Czech JAS-39C/D Gripen multirole fighters fulfill primarily the tasks related to the air defence of the Czech Republic and the NATO within the system of NATINAMDS. In the so-called national reinforcement system the subsonic L-159 ALCA jets could be deployed to fulfil this task too. The radar surveillance of the airspace of the Czech Republic is a responsibility of the 26th Air Command, Control and Surveillance Regiment at Stará Boleslav. Altogether seven radio-technical companies are spread around the country so that they can continuously cover its whole territory.

History

First years

The separation saw a large reduction in types, numbers, and bases. In 1994, the 3rd Corps of Tactical Aviation was created. The newest fighter in the Czechoslovak Air Force arsenal was the MiG-29 (Izdelie 9.12). As there was only one general maintenance kit, which was given to newly created Slovak Republic, and all the material was split 1:1 with Slovakia, maintenance costs for the Czech Fulcrums would be too high. Along with the unreasonably high costs, speculative costs for spare parts imported from Russia, which were realised through third-party companies (Mil Mi-24 rotor blades acquisitions were over-priced by 400%), this led to the exchange of 10 MiG-29s with Poland for PZL W-3A Sokół rescue helicopters with avionics and ground support. Therefore, 10 air superiority fighters were exchanged for 11 light helicopters and this acquisition became a strongly discussed affair during the mid-1990s. The burden of readiness squadron passed to the MiG-23s.

The new-era Air Force of the Czech Army was effectively formed on 1 July 1997 when the 3rd Corps of Tactical Aviation and the 4th Air Defence Corps were united. The members of both units have taken part in Alliance actions since the Czech Republic entered NATO on 12 March 1999. The Air Force began to revise and update its doctrines and aircraft and the acquisition of a new, western fighter was considered. MiG-23MFs were retired in 1994, MLs in 1998 and MiG-21s were reestablished as an interim type for what was supposed to be a transition period before buying a new fighter – which was determined to be the Swedish JAS 39 Gripen multi-role fighter aircraft. Because of the devastating floods that hit the country during 2002, the deal was deferred.

2000s
A new international tender was issued for an interim solution. Gripen again won this tender among six different bidders as the Czech Republic accepted a government-to-government 10-year lease from Sweden that did not involve BAE Systems. Media allegations of BAE Systems kickbacks to decision makers during the original sales effort have led nowhere in judicial inquiries.

In December 2008, the Czech Air Force wanted to train helicopter pilots for desert conditions for the upcoming mission in Afghanistan. Israel was the only country that was ready to help out, as it saw this as an opportunity to thank the Czech Republic for training Israeli pilots and supporting Israel when it first became a state.

The independence of the Czech Air Force was terminated on 1 December 2003 when the force became a part of newly established Joint Forces of the Czech Army with the command post located at Olomouc. Within the new structure the Air Force Commander-in-Chief was named as a Joint Forces Chief Commander Deputy.

2010s
The Air Force operated within this structure until 30 June 2013. Within the framework of the reorganisation of the Army, on 1 July 2013 the independent High Command of the Czech Air Force (Czech: Velitelství vzdušných sil) was established, headquartered in Prague with new Commander in Chief Brigadier General Libor Štefánik. Former Joint Forces Command and Support Forces Command HQs were disbanded by 30 June 2013.
With the Gripen contract due to expire in 2015, speculation mounted about whether that leasing agreement will be renewed or another type of fighter plane chosen. The Czech government expected a tender to be organised to provide a force of 18 supersonic fighters after 2015. The JAS-39 Gripen was generally accepted as the most effective option owing to the existing infrastructure, the availability of trained personnel and previous good operational experience. However, the background of the existing contract – specifically the broadly discussed issue of alleged corruption – prevented politicians from settling for this quick solution, favouring instead a general tender with more bidders offering such types as the F-16, F/A-18, F-15SE or F-35A.

The creation of a non-supersonic air force has also been discussed as an option, owing to the perceived high costs and limited usefulness of keeping supersonic assets in a country surrounded by allied countries (all are European Union members and NATO members, except Austria). In this scenario the subsonic L-159 would become the backbone of the air force. The latest 2011 White Book clearly states that the supersonic fleet is to be continued for the protection of the Czech Republic and for co-operation within the NATO Integrated Air Defence System. Twelve single-seat and two twin-seat aircraft are viewed as sufficient for patrolling the Czech Republic, while 18 can support the sentry role in other NATO countries. A preliminary RFI requested 18 aircraft. The White Book specifies the 12+2 solution, requiring strategic requirements for the supersonic air force to be specified by November 2011.

On 16 May 2014, the director general of the Swedish defence and export agency FXM and the Czech deputy defence minister for defence acquisitions signed the "Annex prolonging agreement of lease of the JAS-39 Gripen aircraft", ensuring also the continuous upgrading and increasing the capabilities of these machines. The Swedish supersonic aircraft will equip the Czech Air Force until 2027 with an option for further two years.

Czech Defense Minister Martin Stropnický has unveiled plans to replace Soviet-designed military equipment with new weapons and to acquire helicopters and radars for the Czech Air Force, with tenders expected to be launched in 2015. In June 2019, the Czech Defence Minister submitted a contract to the government for the procurement of two C-295 transport aircraft to replace its Yakovlev Yak-40s. On 22 August 2019, Czech Prime Minister Andrej Babiš announced that the Czech Air Force had selected an offer from Bell Helicopter for eight UH-1Y Venom and four AH-1Z Viper helicopters. A contract for the helicopters was signed on 13 December 2019.

2020s
In September 2021 Czech Defense minister Lubomír Metnar signed contract with government of Israel for SPYDER Air Defense systems to replace old Soviet era 2K12M2 Kub (SA-6) systems.
In April 2022 after Czech republic donated some of its Mi-24 helicopters to Ukraine as part of the military support, the US DoD decided to give additional 6 AH-1Z Viper and 2 UH-1Y Venom from their reserves as a gift to boost insufficient number of already ordered helicopters.

In July 2022 Czech government selected F-35A Lightning II as a new fighter aircraft to enter service after lease of the JAS-39 ends in 2027. For that purpose minister of defence Jana Černochová was authorised to start negotiation on procurement of 24 fighters with the government of United States of America.

CzAF-NATO cooperation
Since the Czech Republic joined the NATO, the regular participation at a number of Alliance's international exercises became a matter of course for the Czech Air Force. In 2009, the Czech Republic concluded an agreement regarding the cross-border collaboration and training with neighbouring Germany.

NATO Tiger Association

In 2002, the NATO Tiger Meet was held at Portuguese Beja air base. The 331st Helicopter Squadron was honored there by proclaiming it as a full member of the NATO Tiger Association. The squadron also received the most prestigious trophy, the Silver Tiger. With its new 221st Helicopter Squadron designation the unit continues, rejuvenated by new incoming members, in the Tiger tradition through today.

After the deployment of new JAS-39 Gripen fighters in 2005, four Gripens took part in the NATO Tiger Meet for the first time in 2008 at French Landivisiau. In 2010, the 211st Tactical Squadron was accepted as a full member of the NATO Tiger Association at Volkel Air Base, and the squadron was awarded a Silver Tiger Trophy.

AWACS
In 2011, the Czech Republic became the eighteenth country taking part in the NATO Airborne Early Warning and Control (NAEW&C) programme. Taking part in that international initiative means for Czech Air Force members an active participation in AWACS operations. A participation on the NAEW&C programme will cost the Czech Republic some 90 million CZK a year.

Foreign deployments

Afghanistan

In December 2009, the Czech Air Force members started to build-up a rear for their new helicopter unit to be deployed in Afghanistan. After that the first three modernized Mi-171Sh helicopters armed for self-defense with PKM machine guns were air-transported to Afghanistan by Antonov An-124 Ruslan transport aircraft on 5 January 2010. To the FOB Sharana permanent forward operational base all helicopters and unit members numbering 110 soldiers were flown on 17 January 2010. The Czech helicopter unit known as Task Force Hippo was ranged under Alliance Regional Command East. TF Hippo entered ISAF operations on 25 January 2010.

The first advisory group of the Czech Air Force was sent to Afghanistan in April 2008. Involved then there were members of the 231st of the time and the recent 221st Helicopter Squadron who have been tasked to participate in an establishment of the new Afghan National Army. As a part of the international Operational Mentoring and Liaison Team (OMLT) they started to work as instructors during training of Afghan Mi-24 attack helicopter crews and in the same way to train ground personnel.

A new Czech team was added to the deployment in 2010. The new Czech group consisted of pilots and technicians from the 243rd Helicopter Squadron, respectively from the 24th Transport Air Base at Prague-Kbely. The main task of Kbely AMT (Air Mentoring Team) section has been defined as air training of Afghan Mi-17/Mi-171 transport helicopter crews.

The Czech Republic also provided a material help to Afghan Air Force which included supplies of aviation equipment – six Mi-17 transport helicopters and six Mi-24 attack helicopters. After selected helicopters underwent major overhauls and modernizations all have been presented to the Afghan National Army during the 2007–2009.

Baltics

The Czech Republic first joined the Baltic Air Policing (BAP) mission from 1 May until 31 August 2009 when a four-Gripen contingent was based in Baltic region. The second mission of the task force took place from 1 September 2012 until 4 January 2013. The main task of the Baltic Air Policing 2012 mission was to ensure protection of the airspace over the land and water territory of the three Baltic states – Latvia, Lithuania and Estonia. The whole mission was a part of NATINADS, operating from the Šiauliai Air Base in Lithuania. Remaining Czech Air Force Gripens were also in a 24/7 readiness on their home base at Čáslav. As in 2009, also during the 2012 Baltic mission the targets of Alpha scrambles were Russian military aircraft that failed to observe the flight rules of the civilian air corridors.

Sinai Peninsula

One of the most important tasks of the Czech military transport aviation in recent years is to provide support to the international Multinational Force and Observers (MFO) peace mission at the Sinai Peninsula. A small unit with one transport C-295M turboprop belonging to the equipment of the 24th Transport Air Base at Prague-Kbely has operated there since early November 2013 and contributes to the surveillance and monitoring the peace agreement between Egypt and Israel.

Ukraine
In relation to the 2014 pro-Russian unrest in Ukraine the Government of the Czech Republic decided to provide help to the Ukrainian people. The first large-scale evacuation took place on 27 February 2014, when two aircraft departed the 24th Transport Air Base at Prague-Kbely for Kyiv, Ukraine. The A319CJ was fitted with two PTUs (Patient Transport Units) and two stretchers, the C-295M carried one PTU and 12 stretchers. The aircraft brought 27 Ukrainian citizens to the Czech Republic. Medical care was provided during the flight by a team of military medical personnel from the Centre of the aviation rescue service at Plzeň-Líně and from the Central Military Hospital in Prague. The second MEDEVAC mission took place on 6 March 2014, when one C-295M brought to the Czech Republic further 11 wounded persons.

Structure

The Czech Air Force consists of the following main units:

  Air Force Command, in Prague
  21st Tactical Air Force Base "Zvolenská", in Čáslav
 211th Tactical Squadron, with 14× JAS-39C/D Gripen
 212th Tactical Squadron, with 14× L-159A ALCA. 2x L-159T1 ALCA
 213th Training Squadron, with 2× L-159A ALCA, 3× L-159T1 ALCA, 3× L-159T2 ALCA
  22nd Helicopter Air Base "Biskajská", in Náměšť nad Oslavou
 221st Helicopter Squadron, with 13× Mi-35, 4× Mi-171Sh
 222nd Helicopter Squadron, with 11× Mi-171Sh
  24th Transport Air Base "T. G. Masaryka", in Prague-Kbely
 241st Transport Squadron, with 2× A319CJ
 242nd Transport and Special Squadron, with 6× CASA C-295, 6× L-410
 243rd Helicopter Squadron, with 3× Mi-8, 5× Mi-17, 7× W-3A
 HEMS station "Kryštof 07", with 1× W-3A, at Plzeň-Líně airport
  25th Air Defence Missile Regiment "Tobrucký", in Strakonice
 251st Air Defence Missile Group, with 2K12M2 (SA-6)
 252nd Air Defence Missile Group, with RBS-70
  26th Air Command, Control and Surveillance Regiment, in Stará Boleslav
 261st Control and Reporting Centre (CRC), in Hlavenec, reports to NATO's Integrated Air Defense System CAOC Uedem in Germany
 262nd Radiotechnical Battalion, in Hlavenec
 1st Radiotechnical Company, in Nepolisy, with RAT-31DL
 2nd Radiotechnical Company, in Polička, with P-37 and PRV-17 mobile radars
 3rd Radiotechnical Company, in Stará Ves nad Ondřejnicí, with radars P-37, PRV-17, ST-68U, and RL-4AS mobile radars
 4th Radiotechnical Company, in Sokolnice, with RAT-31DL
 5th Radiotechnical Company, in Třebotovice, with radars P-37, PRV-17 and ST-68U mobile radars
 6th Radiotechnical Company, in Kříženec, with radars P-37, PRV-17, ST-68U, and RL-4AS mobile radars
 7th Radiotechnical Company, in Hrušovany, with P-37 and PRV-17 mobile radars
 263nd Support Battalion, in Hlavenec
 Force Protection Company
 Reserve Control and Reporting Centre, in Větrušice
 Logistic Company
 Radar Maintenance Center, in Olomouc
 Prague Air Traffic Services Station, at Prague Airport
  Pardubice Airport Authority
 Flight Training Centre (CLV) Pardubice, with 1× EV-97, 8× Z-142CAF, 1× Zlin Z-142, 1× Zlin Z-43, 7× L-39C, 2× L-410UVP, 6× Mi-2 and 6× Mi-17 (as of 31 December 2017), is not a part of the Air Force. Primary flight training was outsourced as of 1 April 2004. CLV is a branch of LOM PRAHA s.p., state owned company.

Aircraft

Current inventory

Notes

References

Bibliography
 Brown, Alan Clifford. The Czechoslovak Air Force in Britain, 1940–1945 (PhD Thesis). University of Southampton, Faculty of Arts, School of Humanities, 1998, 237 pages. 

 Titz, Zdenek; Davies, Gordon and Ward, Richard. Czechoslovakian Air Force, 1918–1970 (Aircam Aviation Series no. S5). Reading, Berkshire, UK: Osprey Publishing Ltd., 1971. .

External links

 Global Security entry
 Official Czech Army site
 Book about JAS Gripen in Prague
 Photo galleries of the Czech Air Force
 Photo at Photo Planes.com
 Transcript of Czech Parliament concerning MiG-29 exchange with Poland

Air forces by country
Military of the Czech Republic
Aviation in the Czech Republic
1993 establishments in the Czech Republic
Military units and formations established in 1993